The Guadalajara International Book Fair, better known as the FIL (from its Spanish name: Feria Internacional del Libro de Guadalajara) is the largest book fair in the Americas, and second-largest book fair in the world after Frankfurt's. It is also considered the most important cultural annual event of its kind in the Spanish-speaking world.
The purpose of the FIL is to provide an optimal business environment for the book-industry professionals and exhibitors who attend the fair, and for the reading public eager to meet authors and pick up the latest entries in the market.

Created in 1987, the FIL is put on by the University of Guadalajara and is held at the Expo Guadalajara convention center, which has  of floor space. FIL is held every year, starting on the last Saturday in November and continuing for nine days, in Guadalajara, Jalisco, Mexico.

The current managing director of the Guadalajara International Book Fair is Marisol Schulz, and its president is Raúl Padilla López. The book fair won the Princess of Asturias Award for Communication and Humanities in 2020. In 2022, Guadalajara became the World Book Capital. In this regard, the book fair is preparing to receive the largest number of countries participating in the event. It is known that the publishing house of the Russian Literary Center plans to send a special issue of its almanac "Russian Seasons" to the exhibition.

Prizes and honours 

As a way of rewarding and honouring literary publishing, the FIL awards the following annual prizes and honours:

 Premio de Literatura Latinoamericana y del Caribe Juan Rulfo (Juan Rulfo Prize for Latin American and Caribbean Literature) (1991)
 Premio y Homenaje Nacional de Periodismo Cultural Fernando Benítez (Fernando Benítez Prize and National Homage to Cultural Journalism) (1992)
 Reconocimiento al Mérito Editorial (Publishing Merit Award) (1993)
 Premio Sor Juana Inés de la Cruz (Sor Juana Inés de la Cruz Prize) (1993)
 ArpaFIL (1995)
 Homenaje al Bibliófilo (Homage to Bibliophiles) (2001)
 Homenaje al Bibliotecario (Homage to Librarians) (2002)
 Premio FIL de Literatura en Lenguas Romances (FIL Prize in Romance Language Literature) (2013) awarded to Yves Bonnefoy

Invited countries or cultural regions 

Since 1993, the FIL has invited a country or region to be the guest of honor, providing each an opportunity to display the best of its cultural and literary heritage, as listed in the following table:

History

2005 
 15,357 exhibitors from 45 countries
Visitor attendance at the fair was 494,388
2,899 cultural activities

2006 
1,307,002 visits were made to the FIL website
Visitor attendance was 525,000
84,495 children at activities for children
16,740 exhibitors
1,523 journalists and 439 communications media accredited from 60 countries
296 book presentations with their respective authors
110 literary agents
94 artistic and musical activities

2013 
 1,935 publishing houses from 43 countries
 Visitor attendance at the fair was 1,000,000

References

External links 

Guadalajara
Trade fairs in Mexico
Mexican culture